The Kenwood Park Water Tower is an octagonal brick and stone water tower in the Kenwood neighborhood of Minneapolis, Minnesota, United States.  It was built in 1910 and designed by Frederick William Cappelen, the city of Minneapolis engineer at the time.  The tower is 110 feet tall, making it the tallest structure in Kenwood.  The tower has not been used to store water since 1954.  The tower was built to alleviate water pressure and storage problems in the Lowry Hill area.  Although the tower is not the work of a master architect or representative of a specific architectural style, its design is distinctive.  It is ornamented with projecting ribs, narrow rectangular windows, and Lombard bands, suggesting a medieval fortress.  The tower serves as a distinct visual focus within the neighborhood.

The Kenwood Park Water Tower is one of three stone water towers built in Minneapolis during the early 20th century. The others are Washburn Park Water Tower in 'Tangletown' and Prospect Park Water Tower in southeast Minneapolis.

Broadcasting

FM

References 

Buildings and structures in Minneapolis
Towers completed in 1910
Water towers in Minnesota
1910 establishments in Minnesota